Lindlarer Sülz  is a river of North Rhine-Westphalia, Germany. The Sülz is formed by the confluence of the Kürtener Sülz with the Lindlarer Sülz in Lindlar-Hommerich.
.

See also
List of rivers of North Rhine-Westphalia

References 

Rivers of North Rhine-Westphalia
Rivers of Germany